The Waiheke Local Board is one of the 21 local boards of the Auckland Council. It is one of three local board areas overseen by the Waitematā and Gulf Ward councillor.

The local board area includes Waiheke Island, Rangitoto Island, Motutapu Island, Motokorea Island, Motuihe Island, Ponui Island and Rakino Island.

Cath Handley is the current chair of the board.

2016-2019 term

The 2016-2019 board consists of:
 Cath Handley (chair)
 Paul Walden (deputy chair)
 Shirin Brown
 John Meeuwsen
 Bob Upchurch

References

Local boards of the Auckland Region